Facundo Bagnis and Federico del Bonis were the defending champions, but did not participate this year.
Martín Alund and Horacio Zeballos won the final 6–3, 6–3 against Ariel Behar and Carlos Salamanca.

Seeds

Draw

Draw

References
 Main Draw

Challenger ATP de Salinas Diario Expreso